Blacktown City Football Club is an Australian semi-professional football club based in Blacktown, New South Wales. Founded in 1953, the club currently competes in the National Premier Leagues NSW. Blacktown City's home ground is Landen Stadium in the suburb of Seven Hills.

History
The club was formed in 1953 as Toongabbie Soccer Club and changed their name to Blacktown City in 1979. The club competed in the National Soccer League in 1980, 1981, 1984, 1985, 1986, 1989 and 1990. Since then they have competed in the highest level in New South Wales, the NSW Premier League, where they have finished Premiers (1st in the League) in 2001, 2002/03, 2004/05, 2006 and 2008.

The Blacktown City Demons took out the double in 2007 winning both the Premiership and then staging a comeback from 1–1 with ten men to defeat Bankstown City 3–1 and claim the Championship. The team was known as Blacktown City Demons and owned by The Demons Sports Club until 2009 when the club went into liquidation. The demon image was retained in the logo but dropped from the name.

On 2 August 2017, Blacktown City defeated Central Coast Mariners 3-2 in the Round of 32 of the 2017 FFA Cup, becoming the fifth state-level side in FFA Cup history to defeat A-League opposition. Blacktown made it to the competition's quarter-finals, having defeated APIA Leichhardt Tigers in the Round of 16, where they would be eliminated on penalties by the Western Sydney Wanderers. This equals the Demons best finish in the FFA Cup, which they first achieved in 2016 when they lost to Sydney FC.

Players

First team squad

Notable former players
Players included in this section have either represented their nation or have had their careers progress by playing or coaching in the A-League.

Note 1: Charlton played one game for Blacktown in 1980, scoring a goal. It was his last professional match.

Seasons

Honours

Regional
Ampol Cup
Champions (1): 1985
 Waratah Cup
Champions (5): 1991, 1993, 1996, 2006, 2014
Runners-Up (1): 2015
 Johnny Warren Cup
Champions (1): 2006
 NSW Division 1 / Super League / Premier League / NPL NSW Men's 1
Premiers (8): 1988, 1993, 2000, 2000–01, 2002–03, 2006, 2007, 2014
Champions (9): 1991, 1998, 1999, 2000, 2007, 2010, 2014, 2016, 2022
Runners-Up (7): 1992, 1993, 1995, 2000–01, 2001–02, 2002–03, 2006

Domestic
 National Premier Leagues
Champions (1): 2015

References

External links
 Official Website
 Oz Football profile
 Goodbye Demons, hello Blacktown FC, Blacktown Advocate, 24 December 2009

 
Association football clubs established in 1953
New South Wales Premier League teams
National Premier Leagues clubs
Soccer clubs in Sydney
National Soccer League (Australia) teams
1953 establishments in Australia
Blacktown